"Day Eleven: Love" (often referred to as just "Love") is the fourth single by Ayreon, released on 2004, from their album The Human Equation.

Music 
The song follows the main story of the album. On the eleventh day, upon Reason'''s suggestion, Me gives in and returns to the day when he met his Wife. It was a Friday night at a dance party of some sort. Me and Wife dance, while Passion and Love allude to the fact that it was love at first sight. However, there are morbid indications from Agony ("Remember your father, you're just like him") and Fear ("Nobody loved you, nobody will"; however, Fear is more hopeful in this aspect). Passion and Pride, throughout, in their own way, encourage Me.

 Music Video 
A music video was shot for the song, but it is actually a promotional video for the album. It presents the vocalists who sing on the album, and also features footages of the recording of the album, as well as videos of Arjen meeting some of the vocalists.

 Track listing 
"Day Eleven: Love" [Radio Edit] - (3:37)
"Day Two: Isolation" - (8:42)
"No Quarter" (Led Zeppelin Cover) - (3:38)
"Space Oddity" (David Bowie Cover) - (4:56)

This is not the same cover of "Space Oddity" that first appeared on the special edition of the Star One album, Space Metal'', another project of Arjen's. This version is sung by Eric Clayton.

Personnel 
Arjen Lucassen - guitar, bass, keyboard, synthesizer.
Eric Clayton (Saviour Machine) - vocals
James LaBrie (Dream Theater) - vocals
Marcela Bovio (Stream of Passion, Elfonía) - vocals
Mikael Åkerfeldt (Opeth) - vocals
Devon Graves (Deadsoul Tribe) - vocals
Heather Findlay (Mostly Autumn) - vocals
Irene Jansen - vocals
Magnus Ekwall (The Quill, Monument Seven) - vocals
Ed Warby (Gorefest) - drums
Joost van den Broek - spinet (album), keyboard (tour 2002)

References 
Day Eleven: Love page at Ayreon's official website

External links
Ayreon official website

2004 singles
Ayreon songs
2004 songs